The Best of Times News is a monthly news-magazine published in Shreveport, Louisiana. Since 1993, it has been a premier printed voice to and for adults over 50 years of age in Northwest Louisiana. Its mission is to "Celebrate Age and Maturity" and to help the over 50,000 readers make these years the best that they can be.

External links 
The Best of Times News (official website)

1993 establishments in Louisiana
Monthly magazines published in the United States
News magazines published in the United States
Magazines established in 1993
Magazines published in Louisiana
Mass media in Shreveport, Louisiana